Dennis Keating (born 18 October 1940 in Cork) is a former Irish footballer.

Keating made one appearance in The Football League for Chester against Bradford City in October 1962, alongside fellow debutant Jimmy McGill. He then appeared in an FA Cup tie against Tranmere Rovers before quickly moving on to Wellington Town. He later gave up football to become a monk.

Bibliography

References

1940 births
Living people
Sportspeople from Cork (city)
English Football League players
Republic of Ireland association footballers
Association football wingers
Chester City F.C. players
Telford United F.C. players
Irish Christian monks